This is a list of United States national Golden Gloves champions in the light heavyweight division, along with the state or region they represented.

1928 - Dave Maier - Chicago
1929 - Edward Wills - Chicago
1930 - Buck Everett - Gary
1931 - Jack Kranz - Gary
1932 - Vernon Miller - Davenport
1933 - Max Marek - Chicago
1934 - Joe Louis - Detroit
1935 - Joe Bauer - Cleveland
1936 - Carl Vinciquerra - Omaha
1937 - Herman West - Centralia
1938 - Linto Guerrieri - Rockford
1939 - Jimmy Reeves - Cleveland
1940 - James Richie - St. Louis
1941 - Hezzie Williams - Chicago
1942 - Tom Attra - Fort Worth
1943 - Reedy Evans - Chicago
1944 - Ray Standdifer - Cleveland
1945 - Tom Attra - Fort Worth
1946 - Bob Foxworth - St. Louis
1947 - Dan Bucceroni - Kenosha
1948 - Buddy Turner - Cincinnati
1949 - Wesbury Bascom - St. Louis
1950 - Jesse Brown - Toledo
1951 - Bobby Jackson - Cleveland
1952 - Eddie Jones  - Chicago
1953 - Calvin Butler - Cleveland
1954 - Orville Pitts - Dayton
1955 - Eddie Jenkins - Detroit
1956 - Jim Boyd - Montgomery
1957 - Ernest Terrell - Chicago
1958 - Kent Green - Chicago
1959 - Cassius Clay - Louisville
1960 - Jefferson Davis- Nashville
1961 - Charles Williams - St. Louis
1962 - Billy Joiner - Cincinnati
1963 - Ted Gullick - Cleveland
1964 - Harley Cooper - Omaha
1965 - Larry Charleston - Detroit
1966 - Gerald Pate - Milwaukee
1967 - Brady Bredzeal - Los Angeles
1968 - Leonard Hutchins - Detroit
1969 - Dave Mathews - Cleveland
1970 - Felton Wood - Grand Rapids
1971 - Marvin Johnson - Indianapolis
1972 - Verbie Garland - Toledo
1973 - D. C. Barker - Rocky Mountain
1974 - Robert Stewart - Lowell
1975 - Gene Ratliff - Little Rock
1976 - Rick Jester - Detroit
1977 - Neil Coleman - Virginia
1978 - Charles Singleton - Pennsylvania
1979 - Lee Roy Murphy - Chicago
1980 - Steve Eden - Iowa
1981 - Johnny Williams - Chicago
1982 - Keith Vining - Detroit
1983 - Ricky Womack - Detroit
1984 - Evander Holyfield - Knoxville
1985 - Donald Stephens - Fort Worth
1986 - Harvey Richards - Illinois
1987 - Terry McGroom - Chicago
1988 - Terry McGroom - Springfield
1989 - Terry McGroom - Springfield
1990 - Jeremy Williams - Iowa
1991 - Jeremy Williams - Detroit
1992 - Terry McGroom - Illinois
1993 - Benjamin McDowell - Knoxville
1994 - Antonio Tarver - Sunshine State
1995 - Glenn Robinson - New York metropolitan area
1996 - Tim Williamson - Pennsylvania
1997 - BJ Flores - Kansas City
1998 - Steve Cunningham - Washington
1999 - Michael Simms - California
2000 - Arthur Palac - Detroit
2001 - Chris Arreola - California
2002 - Allan Green - Oklahoma
2003 - DeAndrey Abron - New Mexico
2004 - De'Rae Crane - Iowa
2005 - Rommel Rene - Florida
2006 - Yathomas Riley - California
2007 - Siju Shabazz - Colorado
2008 - Azea Augustama - Miami
2009 - D'Quadre Allen - Florida
2010 - Robert Brant - Upper Midwest
2011 - Derrick Geer - Tennessee
2012 - Jerry Odom - Washington D.C.
2013 - Steven Nelson - Omaha
2014 - Malcolm McAllister - Long Beach
2015 - Devonte Campbell - Newark
2016 - Damion Scarborough  - Georgia
2017 - Abel Gonzalez - Florida

References

Golden Gloves